A logojet is an airliner with an advertising paint scheme (or livery). Logojets used for advertising companies remain uncommon due to the time and cost of repainting an entire airliner.

When accommodating advertisements, the aircraft's normal livery often disappears completely from the fuselage, leaving only the airline's logo painted, for example, on the engine's cowling.

Logojets can also advertise sporting and cultural events. In such cases, the logo of the event is usually added to the fuselage without replacing the original livery. An example is Lufthansa airliners that sported a football motif on their noses prior to the 2006 FIFA World Cup in Germany.

Logojets in the United States include those of Western Pacific Airlines and Southwest Airlines Shamu jets  sponsored by Seaworld. Another is Delta Air Lines' Breast Cancer Awareness livery sponsored by the Breast Cancer Research Foundation.

Advertising
Aircraft markings